The Prosperous Thief is a 2002 novel by Australian novelist Andrea Goldsmith.

Plot summary

Alice Lewin has survived the Second World War and, as an adult, visits the Kindertransport archive where she learns of a possible relative.  She travels to Australia in an attempt to meet Henry Lewin, but it is a meeting with unforeseen consequences.

Notes

 Dedication: for Dot
 Epigraph: 'Virtue and crime weigh the same, I've seen it: in a man who was both criminal and virtuous.' - Tadeusz Rozewicz
 Epigraph: 'We all live in a phantom dwelling.' - Basho

Reviews
 The Compulsive Reader

Awards and nominations

 2003 shortlisted Miles Franklin Literary Award

References 

2002 Australian novels